Leo Vincent Woodall (born 14 September 1996) is an English actor. He is known for his roles in the second season of the HBO series The White Lotus (2022) and the Netflix series One Day (2023).

Early life
Woodall was born in Hammersmith, West London. He comes from a family of actors, including his father Andrew, stepfather, and grandmother; his parents met at drama school. He has said he is a descendant of Maxine Elliott. Woodall initially wanted to go into sports and was nineteen when he decided to pursue acting while watching the series Peaky Blinders. He graduated with a Bachelor of Arts in Acting from Arts Educational School (ArtsEd) in 2019.

Career
After graduating from ArtsEd, Woodall made his television debut with a guest appearance in a 2019 episode of the BBC One medical soap opera Holby City. He also appeared in the short film Man Down. That summer, Woodall was cast in the upcoming feature film Nomad, having been chosen for the role out of 28,000 submissions. Filming took place in over twenty countries.

In the meantime, Woodall made his feature film debut in Cherry, directed by the Russo brothers. He played Adrian Ivashkov in the Peacock series Vampire Academy. Woodall joined the main cast of the HBO anthology series The White Lotus for its second season in Sicily as Jack, a young tourist from Essex on holiday with his uncle Quentin (Tom Hollander). To prepare for the role and adopt the character's accent, Woodall watched videos of television personality Joey Essex.

Woodall is set to star as Dexter Mayhew opposite Ambika Mod in the Netflix adaptation of David Nicholls' One Day. He will also have a recurring role in the Amazon Prime series Citadel.

Filmography

Film

Television

References

External links
 
 Leo Woodall at Spotlight

Living people
1996 births
English people of American descent
Male actors from London
People educated at the Arts Educational Schools
People from Hammersmith